Mark Gasnier (born 19 July 1981) is an Australian former professional rugby league footballer who played in the 2000s and 2010s. A rugby league New South Wales State of Origin and international representative , he played eleven seasons in the National Rugby League with the St. George Illawarra Dragons, punctuated by two seasons of rugby union played with the French club Stade Français. Gasnier was a member of the Dragons' NRL premiership-winning team in 2010. He retired at the end of the 2011 season. He is the nephew of the 1960s St. George star Reg Gasnier.

Background
Gasnier attended Peakhurst High School.

Professional playing career
Gasnier played his junior rugby league in the St George District with the Mortdale based Renown United club. He toured New Zealand with the Australian Schoolboys team in 1998 and played for them again in 1999.

Gasnier made his first Grade début for the St. George Illawarra Dragons in round 8 of the 2000 season against the Newcastle Knights. He made his first grade début having just played for the Dragons in the preceding NSWRL Premier League game. He made his international début in a 2001 test against the PNG Kumuls, and scored a try on début.

In 2004, Gasnier was dropped from the NSW State of Origin team following a complaint that he had made a lewd telephone call to a woman. After a night of heavy drinking he and team-mates Anthony Minichiello (who was also dropped), Craig Wing and Craig Gower were in a taxi when Gasnier rang a number on Minchiello's mobile phone, leaving an obscene message.  Gasnier told the woman "Where the fuck are you? There's four toey humans in the cab and it's twenty-to-four. Our cocks are fat and fucking ready to spurt sauce, and you're in bed. Fuck me fire up, you sad cunt". 
Gasnier was eventually selected to play in Origin III for the Blues, and scored two tries.

After winning Dally M Centre of the Year in 2005, he signed a new one-year contract, with further one year options for the next four years with the St George Illawarra Dragons. Again Gasnier won the Dally M Centre of the Year.

In early 2007 it was announced that Mark Gasnier, Ben Hornby and Jason Ryles would captain St George Illawarra. However, Gasnier tore his pectoral muscle tackling Nigel Vagana in the Charity Shield pre-season trial and was unable to play again until July. On 21 July, Gasnier made his long-awaited return to the Dragons, in the five-eighth position, with his team winning 38–20 against the Penrith Panthers. Despite Gasnier's shortened season, he was selected for the Australian Kangaroos in October to play the New Zealand Kiwis in Wellington. Gasnier spent 24 minutes on the field before being knocked out by a Steve Matai high tackle. Suffering from concussion, Gasnier was unable to participate further in the game.

Gasnier was named sole captain of the Dragons for the 2008 season. He paired up with Matt Cooper in the centres. Gasnier was selected to play for Australia on 9 May and scored the first two tries. He was selected for Origin I against the Maroons, and helped set up five tries. He was also picked for Origin II despite carrying an injury, but was unable to play the third game. In July, Gasnier reported that he would switch to rugby union at the end of the season to link up with French club Stade Français. Gasnier played his final game for the Dragons against the Manly Sea Eagles at Brookvale in the 3rd Qualifying Final, scoring the Dragons' only points.

Rugby union stint
Gasnier joined French rugby union club Stade Français from October 2008 on a two-year deal worth approximately €300,000 a season. At the Paris club, he was coached by former NSW Waratahs coach Ewen McKenzie. For his début with Stade Français on 26 September 2008, Gasnier played right wing and ran in for a try, finishing off a fine display of passing rugby by the Stade backs, against Bourgoin-Jallieu at the Stade des Alpes in Grenoble before getting injured. On 24 January 2009 he scored the decisive try in a Heineken Cup victory over Ulster. Gasnier also scored a brilliant solo try beating eight defenders in a 30-metre run to the line in Stade Français' 23–18 victory over French rivals SC Albigeois at the Stade Jean Bouin in Paris on 5 November 2009. He is known as "Les Gaz!" by the fans.

Gasnier continued his prolific 2009–10 season by scoring his 6th try of the campaign against Bayonne in round 15 in front of more than 70,000 fans at the Stade de France in Paris. This made him the Top 14's leading try scorer and he continued to impress after switching codes. In April–May 2010 Gasnier was reportedly talking with coach Rod Macqueen about the possibility of Gasnier signing with the Melbourne Rebels for the team's début in the expanded Super 14.

Return to rugby league 
It was announced in June 2010 that Gasnier was intending to return to rugby league following the expiration of his rugby union contract. This was confirmed when he signed a -year deal with former club St George Illawarra.

Gasnier made his comeback for the Dragons against the Penrith Panthers but the Dragons lost 12–8. His second match however was more of a success, as he scored the match winning try for the Dragons as they defeated the South Sydney Rabbitohs 16–13. He went on to play for the Dragons' in the 2010 NRL Grand Final, scoring the first try of the match to help the joint-venture club beat the Sydney Roosters and claim its first premiership.

Gasnier participated in the Dragons' 2011 World Club Challenge and Charity Shield wins.

His good form led to him being selected to join the New South Wales team again for the 2011 State of Origin series. He played all three matches.

On 14 July, he formally announced his retirement from professional rugby league. He finished his career in a semi-final clash at Suncorp Stadium against the Brisbane Broncos, with St. George Illawarra losing 13–12, after a Darren Lockyer field goal in extra time. He then went on to work as a commentator with Fox League.

Accolades
On 20 July 2022, Gasnier was named in the St. George Dragons District Rugby League Clubs team of the century at centre.  The selection caused some controversy as Gasnier had never played for the St. George Dragons club.  Although many consider St. George and St. George Illawarra to be the same club, the NRL has stated that both clubs are separate entities.

See also
 List of players who have converted from one football code to another

References

External links

Stade Français profile 
State of Origin Official website Rugby League Player Stats
2001 Ashes profile

1981 births
Australian rugby league players
Australian rugby union players
Australia national rugby league team players
St. George Illawarra Dragons players
New South Wales City Origin rugby league team players
New South Wales Rugby League State of Origin players
Prime Minister's XIII captains
Prime Minister's XIII players
Rugby league centres
Rugby union centres
Sportsmen from New South Wales
Footballers who switched code
Living people
Rugby league players from Sydney